Daughters in Law is a 1961 comedy novel by the British writer Henry Cecil Leon. As with his other works it combines an examination of issues in the legal profession with a general Wodehousian humour.

Synopsis
A judge has two attractive twin daughters who both follow him into the law, one as a solicitor and one as a barrister. As chance would have it they both fall in love with two brothers, the sons of Major Claude Buttonstep. Unfortunately, he despises lawyers throwing a cloud over their potential marriages. Then as luck would have it a dispute with a neighbour means he now needs legal assistance.

References

Bibliography
 Reilly, John M. Twentieth Century Crime & Mystery Writers. Springer, 2015.
 Sauerberg, Lars Ole . The Legal Thriller from Gardner to Grisham: See you in Court!. Springer, 2016.

1961 British novels
Novels by Henry Cecil
Novels set in London
British comedy novels
Michael Joseph books